Garuda di Dadaku (Garuda in My Heart) is a 2009 Indonesian film directed by Ifa Isfansyah. It is about a young boy who dreams to play for Indonesia's National Under 13 football team, despite his grandfather's wish for him to be an artist.

The film, Ifa's feature-length debut, was produced over six months and featured music by actress and musician, Titi Sjuman and her husband Wong Aksan, as well as a theme song by rock band Netral. Released during the school holidays, the film was viewed by more than 1.2 million people. Despite mixed critical reception, Garuda di Dadaku was nominated for three Citra Awards at the 2009 Indonesian Film Festival, where it received a special jury prize for Best Children's Film. A sequel, Garuda di Dadaku 2, was released in 2011.

Plot
Bayu (Emir Mahira) is a sixth-year student who lives with his mother Wahyuni (Maudy Koesnaedi) and his grandfather Usman (Ikranagara); Bayu's father, an athlete turned taxi driver, died in a car accident several years before. Although Bayu wishes to be a football player like his father before him, Usman insists that he should be an artist; the grandfather enrols Bayu in numerous courses to improve his skills in the arts.

Bayu sneaks in football practice with the help of his friend, the wheelchair-bound Heri (Aldo Tansani), as well as Heri's driver Bang Dulloh (Ramzi). They find an old, empty cemetery to practise in and the guardian of the cemetery, Zahra (Marsha Aruan) allows them to use it and supports Bayu's goal. Bayu is soon discovered by a coach at the local Arsenal School (Ari Sihasale), which gives him a chance to play for Indonesia's National Under-13 Team.

When Usman discovers that Bayu has been practising football, he pressures his grandson to quit. Bayu does not, and eventually Usman relents and reveals the truth, he didn't want Bayu end up like his father and Usman realize he forcing Bayu becoming artist for himself not his. Usmam later apologize to Bayu for forbidding follow his dreams. Eventually Bayu is accepted as a member of the national squad, whom he helps win a tournament while Usman choose Zahra as his artist students.

Cast
 Emir Mahira as Bayu
 Aldo Tansani as Heri
 Marsha Aruan as Zahra
 Ikranagara as Pak Usman
 Maudy Koesnaedi as Wahyuni
 Ramzi as Mang Dulloh
 Ari Sihasale as Pak Johan
 Baron Yusuf as Benny
 Wilson Klein Sugianto as Arthur
 Landung Simatupang as Zahra's father
 Leroy Osmani as Pak Ivan
 Julius Denny as Pak Tukang Baso

Production
Garuda di Dadaku was directed by Ifa Isfansyah. It was his first feature film; he had had previously produced and directed several short films. The director had played football as a child, which may have played a role in the film's production. Salman Aristo was approached by producer Shanty Harmayn to write the screenplay, a task which he accepted.

Production took more than six months. Twelve-year-old Emir Mahira was cast in the lead role of Bayu after his football skills impressed the crew. Ifa found working with children difficult, as they often did not listen to directions. He began letting the children act naturally, and found the results "moving". In an interview with The Jakarta Post, he recalled that he "realized this film belonged to them. This is their world, and we, the adults, are like the keepers."

The Indonesian band Netral provided the film with its titular song, also entitled "Garuda di Dadaku"; the song was adapted from "Apuse", a regional song in Papua. Musical arrangement was handled by husband and wife team Wong Askan and Titi Sjuman.

Release and reception
Garuda di Dadaku was released on 18 June 2009, during school holidays. It reportedly sold 1.2 million tickets, a large number for the Indonesian film industry. In 2010 it was the opening film at the Michel Kinder und Jungen Filmfest, a film festival for children's films in Hamburg, Germany.

Critical reception of the film was mixed. Leila S. Chudori gave Garuda di Dadaku a glowing review in Tempo magazine, writing that it was able to make her, a person generally uninterested in football, enjoy the sport as portrayed on screen; she noted that the film was in the same vein as Bend It Like Beckham (2002). The review for Kompas described the film as being "like a meal where all the spices are just right", with good production values, acting, cinematography, and directing.

Rizal Iwan, writing in The Jakarta Post, found the film's source of conflict unbelievable, as he doubted that a parent would prefer the arts over football; he also found the first half of the film "clunky". However, Iwan found that the remainder of the film flowed well and that Mahira's acting was consistent. The review for the Jakarta Globe, written by Marcel Thee, was scathing. Thee wrote that the film "feels like a dreary soap opera that doesn't belong on the big screen", with "mechanical" acting, "overdramatic" dialogue, and a "disjointed" narrative.

A sequel, entitled Garuda di Dadaku 2, was released in 2011. Directed by Rudy Soedjarwo, it follows Bayu – now a teenager – as he captains the national youth team and deals with personal issues.

Awards
Garuda di Dadaku was nominated for three Citra Awards at the 2009 Indonesian Film Festival but did not win any. It did, however, win a special jury prize for Best Children's Film.

Notes

References
Footnotes

Bibliography

External links

2009 films
Indonesian children's films
Association football films
2000s children's drama films